Arlo L. Olson (April 20, 1918 – October 28, 1943) was a United States Army officer and a recipient of the United States military's highest decoration—the Medal of Honor—for his actions in World War II.

Biography
Olson's family moved to South Dakota 10 years after he was born and he attended school in Toronto, South Dakota. He is also an Eagle Scout and one of nine Eagle Scouts who also were awarded the Medal of Honor. Olson attended the University of South Dakota from 1936 to 1940 were became a member of the Sigma Alpha Epsilon fraternity, and was commissioned through Army ROTC and  following graduation. By October 13, 1943, was serving as a captain in the 15th Infantry Regiment, 3rd Infantry Division. On that day and the following two weeks, he showed conspicuous leadership during the push across the Volturno River in Italy. Olson repeatedly led his men in attacks against German forces, personally capturing several enemy positions, until he was mortally wounded during a reconnaissance patrol. He was posthumously awarded the Medal of Honor ten months later, on August 31, 1944.

Olson, aged 25 at his death, was buried in Fort Snelling National Cemetery, Minneapolis, Minnesota.

His wife, Myra (Boudreaux) Olson and daughter, Sandra Laverne Olson survived him. (Now deceased). Still living are his granddaughter, Katrin Danielle (Sirjane) Woods; his great-granddaughters, Faith Mikel (Rousselle) Bush and Cameron Danielle Woods;  and his great-great-grandson, Christopher Odin Bush.

Medal of Honor citation
Captain Olson's official Medal of Honor citation reads:

See also

List of Medal of Honor recipients
List of Medal of Honor recipients for World War II

References

1918 births
1943 deaths
University of South Dakota alumni
United States Army personnel killed in World War II
United States Army Medal of Honor recipients
United States Army officers
People from Clay County, Iowa
People from Deuel County, South Dakota
World War II recipients of the Medal of Honor
Military personnel from Iowa